Crestwood is an urban place in Sydney, New South Wales, Australia.

Education
Crestwood High School - 7-12 Government Owned
Crestwood Public School - K-6 Government Owned (Crestwood High feeder school
St Michael's Primary School - K-6 Catholic School (Gilroy College and Oakhill College feeder school)

Crestwood Reserve
Is a large public park located in the centre of Crestwood, facilities include:
 2 Rugby League fields
 6 Tennis courts
 2 Playgrounds
 2 Half court Basketball courts
 Netball courts
 Picnic and BBQ facilities
 Fenced dog leash free area
 Skate park
 Girl Guides hall

Places of worship
Norwest Anglican - formerly known as Crestwood Anglican Church or St Andrews Crestwood - is located in Crestwood, adjacent to Crestwood High.
Chapel Lane  is the evening service of Norwest Anglican

References

External links
Crestwood Reserve (Shire council site)

Sydney localities
The Hills Shire